The 1908–09 Harvard Crimson men's ice hockey season was the 12th season of play for the program.

Season
After two season where they narrowly missed winning the Intercollegiate Hockey Association championship, Harvard returned to the top of the heap in 1909. The defense for the Crimson was stellar all season with the team surrendering just 7 goals in 9 games as they shut out opponents 5 times to earn the sixth undefeated season in the twelve years the program had existed.

For the first time since 1899 Harvard did not play its final game of the season against Yale.

Roster

Standings

Schedule and Results

|-
!colspan=12 style=";" | Regular Season

References

Harvard Crimson men's ice hockey seasons
Harvard
Harvard
Harvard
Harvard
Harvard